Nanaimo is a city of about 100,000 on the east coast of Vancouver Island, in British Columbia, Canada. "The Harbour City" was previously known as the "Hub City", which was attributed to its original layout design with streets radiating from the shoreline like the spokes of a wagon wheel, and to its relatively central location on Vancouver Island. Nanaimo is the headquarters of the Regional District of Nanaimo.

Nanaimo is served by the Island Highway along the east coast, the BC Ferries system, and its regional airport. It is also on the dormant Island Rail Corridor.

History 

The Indigenous peoples of the area that is now known as Nanaimo are the Snuneymuxw. An anglicised spelling and pronunciation of that word gave the city its current name.

The first Europeans known to reach Nanaimo Harbour were members of the 1791 Spanish voyage of Juan Carrasco, under the command of Francisco de Eliza. They gave it the name Bocas de Winthuysen after naval officer Francisco Javier Winthuysen y Pineda. When the British Hudson's Bay Company (HBC) established a settlement here in 1852, they named it Colvile Town after HBC governor Andrew Colvile. In 1858 it was renamed as Nanaimo, after the local indigenous people. The city has been called "The Harbour City" since the lead-up to Expo 86.

The HBC attempted to start a coal mine at Port Rupert but the project had been unsuccessful. In 1850 Snuneymuxw Chief Che-wich-i-kan, commonly known as "Coal Tyee", brought samples of coal to Victoria. A company clerk was dispatched and eventually the governor James Douglas visited the future site of Nanaimo.

While open to selling coal, the Snuneymuxw wished to retain control of it and retain the exclusive right to mine it. Chief Wun-wun-shum offered to sell coal for five barrels in exchange for one blanket. The HBC representative Joseph William McKay deemed this "impertinent". The Snuneymuxw retained their rights to the resource for a while, but gradually lost them due to other tribes and miners from the failed Port Rupert project.

By 1852, the first shipment of Nanaimo coal was loaded on the Cadboro.

Construction of the Nanaimo Bastion began in 1853 and was finished in 1855.

On 27 November 1854, 24 coal miners and their families from England arrived at the settlement aboard the Beaver and Recovery. They had travelled seven months on the ship Princess Royal arriving at Esquimalt two days earlier. They transferred to the two smaller vessels for the trip to Colvile Town. They were greeted by Joseph William McKay and 21 Scottish miners.

During World War I, the provincial government established an Internment camp for Ukrainian detainees, many of them local, at a Provincial jail in Nanaimo. It operated from September 1914 to September 1915.

In the 1940s, lumber supplanted coal as the main business. Minetown Days have been celebrated in the neighbouring community of Lantzville to highlight some of the locale's history.

In the late nineteenth century, numerous immigrants came from China and settled here. What was known as the first Chinatown in Nanaimo was founded during the gold rush years of the 1860s; it was the third largest in British Columbia. In 1884, because of mounting racial tensions related to the Dunsmuir coal company's hiring of Chinese strikebreakers, the company helped move Chinatown to a location outside city limits.

In 1908, when two Chinese entrepreneurs bought the site and tried to raise rents, the community and 4,000 shareholders from across Canada combined forces and bought a site for the third Chinatown, at a new location focused on Pine Street. That third Chinatown burned down on 30 September 1960 but it was by then mostly derelict and abandoned. A fourth Chinatown, also called Lower Chinatown or "new town", boomed for a while in the 1920s on Machleary Street.

Location and geography

As the site of the main ferry terminal, Nanaimo is the gateway to many other destinations both on the northern part of the island—Tofino, Comox Valley, Parksville, Campbell River, Port Alberni, Rathtrevor Beach Provincial Park—and off its coast—Newcastle Island, Protection Island, Gabriola Island, Valdes Island, and many other of the Gulf Islands.

Buttertubs Marsh is a bird sanctuary located in the middle of the city. Within this is the  "Buttertubs Marsh Conservation Area", owned by the Nature Trust of British Columbia.

Climate
Like much of coastal British Columbia, Nanaimo experiences a temperate climate with mild, rainy winters and warm, dry summers. Due to its relatively dry summers, the Köppen climate classification places it at the northernmost limits of the Csb or warm-summer Mediterranean zone. Other climate classification systems, such as Trewartha, place it firmly in the Oceanic zone (Do).

Nanaimo is usually shielded from the Aleutian Low's influence by the mountains of central Vancouver Island, so that summers are unusually dry for its latitude and location—though summer drying as a trend is found in the immediate lee of the coastal ranges as far north as Skagway, Alaska.

Transportation
Nanaimo is served by two airports: Nanaimo Airport (YCD) with services to Vancouver (YVR), Toronto (YYZ), and Calgary (YYC) and  Nanaimo Harbour Water Aerodrome with services to Vancouver Harbour, Vancouver Airport (YVR South Terminal), and Sechelt;. Nanaimo also has three BC Ferry terminals located at Departure Bay, Duke Point, and downtown. The downtown terminal services Gabriola Island while Departure Bay and Duke Point service Horseshoe Bay and Tsawwassen respectively. A private passenger ferry operates between Nanaimo Harbour and Protection Island. A seasonal passenger ferry operates between Swy-a-Lana Lagoon and Saysutshun (Newcastle Island Marine) Park.

Highways 1, 19, and 19A traverse the city. Bus service in the city is provided by Nanaimo Regional Transit.

The Island Rail Corridor passes through Nanaimo and has a base of operations and yard in the downtown waterfront area.

The Nanaimo Port Authority operates the inner Harbour Basin marina providing mooring for smaller vessels and the W. E. Mills Landing and Marina providing mooring for larger vessels. The Port Authority also operates two terminal facilities one at Assembly Wharf (near the downtown core) and the second at Duke Point for cargo operations. In 2011 the Authority completed the addition of a $22 million cruise ship terminal at Assembly Wharf capable of handling large cruise ships including providing Canada Border Services Agency clearance.

Demographics

In 2016, the average age of a Nanaimoite is 45.5 years old, higher than the national median at 41.2.

In Nanaimo, there are 40,885 private dwellings, 39,165 which are occupied by usual residents (95.8% occupancy rate). The median value of these dwellings are $359,760, which is higher than the national median at $341,556. The average (after-tax) household income in Nanaimo is $48,469, lower than the national median at $54,089. The median individual income is $34,702, which is also lower than the national median ($38,977). The unemployment rate was 7.7%.

Ethnicity 

Note: Totals greater than 100% due to multiple origin responses.

Language 
Nanaimo's population is predominately Anglophone. As of the 2016 census 86.7% of residents claimed English as their mother tongue. Other common first languages were Chinese Languages (2.0%), French (1.3%), German (1.2%) and Punjabi (1.0%).

Religion 
According to the 2021 census, religious groups in Nanaimo included:
Irreligion (60,365 persons or 62.2%)
Christianity (31,135 persons or 32.1%)
Sikhism (1,330 persons or 1.4%)
Islam (1,000 persons or 1.0%)
Hinduism (785 persons or 0.8%)
Buddhism (650 persons or 0.7%)
Judaism (230 persons or 0.2%)
Indigenous Spirituality (170 persons or 0.2%)

Economy

The original economic driver was coal mining; however, the forestry industry supplanted it in the early 1960s with the building of the MacMillan Bloedel pulp mill at Harmac in 1958, named after Harvey MacMillan. Today the pulp mill is owned by the employees and local investors and injects well over half a million dollars a day into the local economy. The largest employer is the provincial government. The service, retail and tourism industries are also big contributors to the local economy.

Technological development on Nanaimo has been growing with companies such as "Inuktun" and the establishment of government-funded Innovation Island as a site to help Nanaimo-based technological start ups by giving them access to tools, education and venture capital.

The average sale price of houses in Nanaimo for 2011 was approximately $350,000. A recent surge of higher-density real estate development, centred in the Old City / Downtown area, as well as construction of a city-funded waterfront conference centre, has proven controversial. Proponents of these developments argue that they will bolster the city's economy, while critics worry that they will block waterfront views and increase traffic congestion. Concerns have also been raised about the waterfront conference centre's construction running over its proposed budget. Nanaimo has also been experiencing job growth in the technology sector.

Media outlets

Nanaimo is served by one newspaper: the Nanaimo News Bulletin (33,000 copies twice a week—audited), which is owned by Black Press. The Harbour City Star, also owned by publisher Black Press, was closed in 2016. On 29 January 2016, the 141-year-old Nanaimo Daily News, shut down. Nanaimo also hosts a bureau for CIVI-DT (CTV 2 Victoria, cable channel 12) and a satellite office for CHEK-DT (Independent, cable channel 6).

Nanaimo is also served by the Jim Pattison Group's CHWF-FM (The Wolf) and CKWV-FM (The Wave), as well as CHLY-FM, an independent community campus radio station and Vista Radio's CKAY-FM (Coast FM). CBC Radio One is heard over CBU from Vancouver, with CBU-FM (CBC Music) and CBCV-FM available as HD Radio signals.

Politics

Federal
In the House of Commons of Canada, Nanaimo is represented by Lisa Marie Barron of the NDP, representing the riding of Nanaimo—Ladysmith since the 2021 election. The city was split into two separate ridings, Nanaimo—Cowichan (Jean Crowder, New Democratic Party), which includes South Nanaimo and Cassidy, and Nanaimo—Alberni (James Lunney, Independent elected as a Conservative), which includes North Nanaimo and Lantzville, until the 2012 federal electoral redistribution.

Provincial
In the Legislative Assembly of British Columbia, Nanaimo is represented by the ridings of Nanaimo (Sheila Malcolmson, BC NDP), Nanaimo-North Cowichan (Doug Routley, BC NDP) and Parksville-Qualicum (Adam Walker, BC NDP). Leonard Krog resigned in 2018 to accept the position of Mayor of Nanaimo. In response, Sheila Malcolmson resigned from federal politics and successfully ran for the vacated position.

Civic

The mayor of Nanaimo is currently Leonard Krog, who replaced Bill Mackay in 2018.

The most well-known mayor Nanaimo ever had was Frank J. Ney, who instigated Nanaimo's well-known bathtub races, which he regularly attended dressed as a pirate. There is a statue to commemorate Ney—dressed in his pirate costume—at Swy-a-Lana Lagoon, which is on the Nanaimo waterfront. Ney was also an MLA for the Social Credit party while he was also mayor. An elementary school has been named in his honour.

Mark Bate became Nanaimo's first mayor in 1875. He served an additional 15 one-year terms as mayor (1875–1879, 1881–1886, 1888–1889, and 1898–1900).

Open government
The city's planning department has steadily produced enough municipal data to warrant a Time magazine article on open-government. Nanaimo has been dubbed "the capital of Google Earth". Working directly with Google, the city fed it a wealth of information about its buildings, property lines, utilities and streets. The result is earth.nanaimo.ca, a wealth of city data viewed through the Google Earth 3D mapping program. Their Open Data Catalogue is available at data.nanaimo.ca.

Education
Nanaimo has over 30 elementary and secondary schools, most of which are public and are operated by School District 68 Nanaimo-Ladysmith.

Aspengrove School is a JrK-grade 12 Independent (private) school accredited as an International Baccalaureate World School and offers the IB Primary Years, IB Middle Years and IB Diploma programme and received a 10 out of 10 by the IB Organization (IBO) in 2011.

The Conseil scolaire francophone de la Colombie-Britannique operates two Francophone schools, École Océane primary school and the École secondaire de Nanaimo.

The main campus of Vancouver Island University is located in Nanaimo, which brings many international students, mostly East Asian, to the city.

The Pacific Biological Station

The Pacific Biological Station, located on the north shore of Departure Bay, was established in 1908. It is the oldest fisheries research centre on the Pacific coast. Operated by Fisheries and Oceans Canada, the station forms a network with eight other scientific facilities.

Museums
The Nanaimo Art Gallery is a public art museum located downtown at 150 Commercial Street. In addition to contemporary exhibitions by local, national and international artists, the Gallery operates Art Lab which offers year-round art-based programs for learners of all ages. The Gallery also holds a collection of artwork, operates The Gallery Store, which features work by local artists and artisans, and runs Artists in the Schools, a program that operates across three school districts.

The Nanaimo Museum is a public historical museum located downtown on the traditional territory of the Snuneymuxw First Nation at 100 Museum Way.

The Vancouver Island Military Museum is a public military historical museum located at 100 Cameron Road.

Arts
The Port Theatre in downtown Nanaimo hosts many performers and shows during the year.

Culture
The Nanaimo bar, which is a no-bake cookie bar with custard filling, is a Canadian dessert named after Nanaimo.

Nanaimo hosts the annual Nanaimo Marine Festival. Part of the festival includes the bathtub race. The race starts in the Nanaimo Harbour downtown, goes around Entrance Island, north-west to Winchelsea Islands by Nanoose Bay and finish in Departure Bay back in Nanaimo. Until the 1990s the race alternated between racing from Nanaimo to Vancouver and from Vancouver to Nanaimo.

Sports and recreation
 Nanaimo is home to the largest sports club on Vancouver Island, Nanaimo United Football Club. NUFC is home to over 1,700 members, and is one of the oldest sports clubs in Canada, having been formed in 1903.
 Nanaimo is home to North America's first legal, purpose-made bungee jumping bridge, operated by WildPlay Element Parks.
 Nanaimo is home to the Canadian Junior Football League's Vancouver Island Raiders, who play at Caledonia Park.
 Nanaimo is home to the British Columbia Hockey League's Nanaimo Clippers and to the Western Lacrosse Association's Nanaimo Timbermen, both of which play at the Frank Crane Arena.
 Nanaimo is home to the Nanaimo Buccaneers of the Vancouver Island Junior Hockey League, who play at the Nanaimo Ice Centre.
 The Nanaimo Pirates, of the B.C. Premier Baseball League (BCPBL), play at Serauxmen Stadium.
 Football Nanaimo plays at Pioneer Park.
 Nanaimo is home to the Senior A lacrosse team the Timbermen of the Western Lacrosse Association. Nanaimo is also home to the Junior A Timbermen and Junior B Timbermen.
 Nanaimo is home to the Nanaimo Hornets Rugby Football Club. Is part of the British Columbia Rugby Union, Established in 1888 is the second oldest Rugby Club in Western Canada, Home ground and club is situated in Pioneer Park since 1968.

Notable people
Terry Beech, politician
Red Carr, professional ice hockey player
Gene Carr, professional ice hockey player
Justin Chatwin, actor
Jimmy Claxton, baseball pitcher who broke US baseball's racial colour barrier
Raymond Collishaw, British World War I flying ace 
Allison Crowe, singer-songwriter and pianist
John DeSantis, actor
Michael Edgson, swimmer
Jodelle Ferland, actress
David Gogo, blues guitarist
Paul Gogo, keyboardist for the rock band Trooper
Christopher Hart, actor and magician
Al Hill, ice hockey player and scout
Bob Hindmarch, professor and ice hockey coach
Constance Isherwood, lawyer
Ingrid Jensen, jazz trumpeter
Susan Juby, author
Diana Krall, jazz pianist and vocalist
Tim Lander, poet
Marc-André Leclerc, alpinist
Susan Morgan, Oregon politician
Callum Montgomery, professional soccer player
Phil Olsen, Olympian javelin
Steve Smith, professional downhill mountain biker
Shane Sutcliffe, boxer
Kirsten Sweetland, triathlete
May Tully, vaudeville actress, writer, director
Lorna Vinden, wheelchair athlete
Layla Zoe, blues and blues rock musician and songwriter

Sister city 

Nanaimo has one sister city:

  Saitama City (←Iwatsuki City), Saitama Prefecture, Japan (1996)

See also
List of coal mines and landmarks in the Nanaimo area
1887 Nanaimo mine explosion

References

External links

 
Cities in British Columbia
Mining communities in British Columbia
Populated places established in 1853
Populated places on the British Columbia Coast
Port cities and towns on the Canadian Pacific coast
Mid Vancouver Island